Panagia Pantobasilissa ("Panagia the Queen of All") is one of the churches in Rafina, Greece.Panagia Pantobasilissa's church was built in remembrance of the Byzantine church in Tirilye  which hold the same name.

See also
Panagia Pantobasilissa church, Tirilye

External links
 

Eastern Orthodox church buildings in Greece
Churches in Attica
Church buildings with domes